is a former Japanese football player. He is currently a goalkeeper coach of Gamba Osaka.

Playing career
Yoshida was born in Suita on August 25, 1974. After graduating from Keio University, he joined J1 League club Kashiwa Reysol in 1997. However he could not play at all in the match behind Yoichi Doi and Yuta Minami until 1998. From 1999, he battles with Minami for the position and he played many matches in 1999 and 2000. The club also won the champions 1999 J.League Cup and the 3rd place 1999 and 2000 J1 League. However he could hardly play in the match from 2001. In 2003 he moved to his local club Gamba Osaka. However he could hardly play in the match behind Naoki Matsuyo. In 2005, he moved to across town to the Gamba Osaka rivals, Cerezo Osaka. He became a regular goalkeeper and played full time in all matches in 3 seasons. In 2005, the club finished at 5th place and he was also selected Best Eleven. However the club was finished at 17th place in 2006 and was relegated to J2 League from 2007. In 2008, he moved to J2 club Avispa Fukuoka. In 2008, he battles with Ryuichi Kamiyama for the position and played many matches. In 2009, although he became a regular goalkeeper, his lost opportunity to play behind Yuji Rokutan from September. In 2010, he moved to Japan Football League club FC Machida Zelvia. He played many matches in 2 season and the club was promoted to J2 from 2012 season. However he retired end of 2011 season.

Club statistics

References

External links

1974 births
Living people
Keio University alumni
Association football people from Osaka Prefecture
People from Suita
Japanese footballers
J1 League players
J2 League players
Japan Football League players
Kashiwa Reysol players
Gamba Osaka players
Cerezo Osaka players
Avispa Fukuoka players
FC Machida Zelvia players
Association football goalkeepers